Villa Caro is a Colombian municipality and town located in the department of Norte de Santander.

References
  Government of Norte de Santander - Villa Caro
  Villa Caro official website

Municipalities of the Norte de Santander Department